Gross regional domestic product (GRDP), gross domestic product of region (GDPR), or gross state product (GSP) is a statistic that measures the size of a region's economy. It is the aggregate of gross value added (GVA) of all resident producer units in the region, and analogous to national gross domestic product.  The GRDP includes regional estimates on the three major sectors including their sub-sectors, namely:

 Raw material sector: Agriculture, animal husbandry, fishery, and forestry.
 Industry sector: Construction, electricity, manufacturing, mining, quarrying, and water.
 Service sector: Communication, finance, private government services, property management, real estate sales, storage, trade, and transport.

"The GRDP is usually presented in nominal and real terms. Nominal GRDP measures the value of the outputs of the economy at current prices. Real GRDP referred to as GRDP at constant prices, measures the value of an economy's output using the prices of a fixed base year. The real GRDP is useful in capturing real output growth since inflationary effects have been removed. It is, therefore, the most widely used measure of real income."

See also
 Gross metropolitan product
 Gross regional product
 List of Chinese administrative divisions by GDP
 List of Chinese administrative divisions by GDP per capita
 List of cities by GDP
 List of EU metropolitan areas by GDP
 List of European Union regions by GDP
 List of German states by GRP
 List of Indonesian provinces by GDP
 List of Indonesian provinces by GRP per capita
 List of NUTS regions in the European Union by GDP
 List of Russian federal subjects by GRP
 List of U.S. metropolitan areas by GDP
 List of U.S. metropolitan areas by GDP per capita
 List of U.S. states and territories by GDP

References

External links
 Eurostat – Statistics Explained: GDP at regional level (European regions at NUTS 2 level)
 UNSTATS (2010) Gross regional product (GRP): an introduction

Gross domestic product